The Dale Hollow Reservoir is a reservoir situated on the Kentucky/Tennessee border. The lake is formed by the damming of the Obey River, 7.3 miles (12 km) above its juncture with the Cumberland River at river mile 380. Portions of the lake also cover the Wolf River. Dale Hollow is one of four major flood control reservoirs for the Cumberland; the others being Percy Priest Lake, Lake Cumberland, and Center Hill Lake. It is also the site of Dale Hollow Lake State Park on the north (Kentucky) side.

Location
Dale Hollow Reservoir lies mainly in northern Tennessee, where it covers portions of Clay, Pickett, and Overton Counties. Small arms of the lake also extend northward into the Kentucky counties of Cumberland and Clinton. The project consists of 27,700 acres (112 km²) of water and 24,842 acres (101 km²) of surrounding land.

History
Dale Hollow Dam and Lake was authorized by the Flood Control Act of 1938 and the River and Harbor Act of 1946. The project was completed by the United States Army Corps of Engineers in 1943. Hydroelectric power generating units were added in 1948, 1949 and 1953. The project was designed by the Corps of Engineers and built under their supervision by private contractors. The hydroelectric generators of Dale Hollow Dam are used to supply power to the surrounding countryside. The dam, power plant and reservoir are currently operated by the Nashville District of the Corps.

The creation of the reservoir resulted in the submerging of a town named Willow Grove. In 1942, the town was purchased by the government in order to create the reservoir. The residents were forced to relocate. Former residents of the town meet annually on Labor Day weekend.

Recreation

The lake is also used recreationally. Water sports are moderately popular, especially water skiing.  Wakeboarding and tubing are two more water sports that can be seen regularly.  The main recreational use is fishing.

Dale Hollow is well known as a prime location for smallmouth bass fishing, currently holding the world record for the largest such fish ever taken (11 lb., 15 oz). It is the lake that is linked with the name Billy Westmoreland, famed smallmouth angler of Celina, Tennessee. The lake and surrounding rivers, the Cumberland River and the Obey River also contain other species such as largemouth bass, crappie, muskellunge, walleye, catfish, gar, and trout.

The Tennessee Wildlife Resources Agency and Kentucky Department of Fish and Wildlife each maintain jurisdiction over the lake's waters within their respective states. There is a reciprocal fishing agreement between the agencies, so recreational fisherman may be licensed by either state in order to fish in the reciprocal zone. Fishermen in areas of the lake outside the zone must be licensed by the governing agency.

Islands
Geiger Island is an island in Dale Hollow Lake.  It is designated as a primitive camping site by the Army Corps of Engineers, which manages Dale Hollow Lake. According to author Darren Shell, the site sees heavy usage during the summer months, and was a traditional camping site of the Boy Scout troops in the area for many years. Henry Geiger, the founder of nearby Cedar Lake Camp, a Christian youth camp in Livingston, Tennessee, was the first to begin camping on the island. The island bears his name.

References

External links
 U.S. Army Corps of Engineers Dale Hollow website
 Dale Hollow Lake Views
 https://www.dalehollowlakeviews.com/advertise

Protected areas of Clay County, Tennessee
Protected areas of Overton County, Tennessee
Protected areas of Pickett County, Tennessee
Reservoirs in Kentucky
Reservoirs in Tennessee
Buildings and structures in Clinton County, Kentucky
Buildings and structures in Cumberland County, Kentucky
Protected areas of Clinton County, Kentucky
Protected areas of Cumberland County, Kentucky
Protected areas of Fentress County, Tennessee
Dams in Tennessee
United States Army Corps of Engineers dams
Bodies of water of Clay County, Tennessee
Bodies of water of Overton County, Tennessee
Bodies of water of Pickett County, Tennessee
Bodies of water of Fentress County, Tennessee
Bodies of water of Clinton County, Kentucky
Bodies of water of Cumberland County, Kentucky
1943 establishments in Kentucky
1943 establishments in Tennessee